Call It Spring is a Canadian retailer of men's and women's shoes, with locations primarily found in shopping malls.

History
Aldo Bensadoun, founder of Aldo Groupe, founded Spring in 1991 under the name Transit, with locations primarily in Canada. With the expansion of the chain across the United States, the name of some stores was changed to Transit Spring. By 2008, all the stores were renamed Spring.

During 2010 the company made a major announcement that indeed call it spring will lead to it expanding in the American market. Aldo Group and JCPenney announced the launch of the Call It Spring brand, which sells as a shop-in-shops concept in JCPenney stores across the United States. The Call It Spring concept were expected to be available in 600 JCPenney stores by the fall of 2011 and JCPenney is the only department store retailer of the brand in the United States.

The Company opened its stores in Azerbaijan, Bahrain, Chile, Colombia, Denmark, Ecuador, Egypt, Georgia, Honduras, India, Israel, Jordan, Kazakhstan, Kuwait, Lebanon, Mexico, Oman, Peru, Philippines, Qatar, Romania, Saudi Arabia, South Africa, and the United Arab Emirates.

References

External links

Companies based in Montreal
Privately held companies of Canada
Retail companies established in 1991
Shoe companies of Canada
1991 establishments in Quebec
Footwear retailers
Canadian brands
Companies that have filed for bankruptcy in Canada
Companies that filed for Chapter 11 bankruptcy in 2020